Japanese supercentenarians are citizens, residents or emigrants from Japan who have attained or surpassed the age of 110 years. , the Gerontology Research Group (GRG) had validated the longevity claims of 263 Japanese supercentenarians, most of whom are women. The oldest verified Japanese and Asian person ever is Kane Tanaka (1903–2022), who lived to the age of 119 years and 107 days, making her the second oldest validated person ever as well. Japan was also home to the world's oldest man ever, Jiroemon Kimura (1897–2013), who lived to the age of 116 years and 54 days.

100 oldest known Japanese

Biographies

Denzo Ishizaki 
 was an elementary school teacher and town assembly member in his hometown Kansago, Ibaraki Prefecture. At the time of his death, Ishizaki had been the world's oldest living man for almost 18 weeks, as well as the 9th oldest living person in the world. He died of multiple organ failure on 29 April 1999 at age 112 years and 191 days, and was the oldest Japanese man ever (until October 2001, when his record was broken by Yukichi Chuganji). However, Ishizaki claimed to be two years older, asserting that his birth register had been "delayed by two years".

Yukichi Chuganji 
Yukichi Chuganji (中願寺 雄吉; Chūganji Yūkichi, 23 March 1889 – 28 September 2003) was a Japanese silkworm breeder, instructor in the agricultural specialty, bank employee and community welfare officer who lived for 114 years and 189 days. At the time of his death, he was the oldest Japanese man ever and the world's oldest living person.

Chuganji didn’t like to eat vegetables but liked beef, pork and chicken. He also ate toffee, drank milk, the occasional apple juice and only drank alcohol in moderation, which he believed were the secrets to a long life. During the last years of his life, he had failing eye sight and was bedridden. He died of natural causes on the evening of 28 September 2003, after being served a glass of apple juice by his 74-year-old daughter who was his only living child. Besides 5 children, Chuganji also had 7 grandchildren and 12 great-grandchildren.

Nabi Tajima 
 succeeded Violet Brown as the world's oldest person after Brown's death on 16 September 2017. She was the last person verified as having been born in the 19th century.

Tajima was born and died on the small island of Kikaijima, about halfway between Okinawa and the main Japanese islands. Her husband, Tominishi Tajima (田島 富二子), died at the age of 93 in 1991. She had nine children, seven sons and two daughters, and in September 2017 she was reported to have had around 160 descendants, including great-great-great-grandchildren. She stated that her longevity was due to sleeping soundly and eating delicious food. Guinness World Records was planning to certify Tajima as the world's oldest person, but she died at a nursing home in Kikai shortly before they could do so.

She died at age 117 years and 260 days on 21 April 2018, and was the oldest Japanese person ever until Kane Tanaka surpassed her age on 19 September 2020.

Masazō Nonaka 
 had been, at the time of his death, Japan's oldest living man since October 2016, and the world's oldest living man for one year, since January 2018. Nonaka was also the oldest person ever born in Hokkaidō.

He had two brothers and three sisters; Nonaka married Hatsuno Nonaka in 1931. They had five children, of whom three were living as of his death. He ran the family onsen, which opened in 1905. He spent most of his later years in a wheelchair, crediting his longevity to eating sweets and relaxing in the hot springs. Nonaka died at home of natural causes at 1:30 a.m. on 20 January 2019, aged 113 years and 179 days.

Fusa Tatsumi 
 

 is a Japanese supercentenarian. Aged , she has been Japan's oldest living person since the death of Kane Tanaka on 19 April 2022.

Fusa Tatsumi was born in Yao, Osaka Prefecture, Empire of Japan on 25 April 1907. Tatsumi moved into the Hakuto nursing home in Kashiwara, Osaka Prefecture, Japan in 2013. When she came to the nursing home she was in relatively good health, and was able to do gymnastics from her wheelchair. At the age of 110, she was still able to do her own makeup. She is now bedridden and rarely speaks. After the death of Lucile Randon of France on 17 January 2023, Tatsumi became the second oldest living person in the world behind Maria Branyas of Spain.

See also 
 Shigechiyo Izumi, wrongly assumed to have been the world's oldest man ever

References 

 
Supercentenarians
Japanese